The British Academy Games Award for Technical Achievement (formerly, British Academy Games Award for Game Innovation) is an award presented annually by the British Academy of Film and Television Arts (BAFTA) as part of the British Academy Games Awards. It is given in honour of "the best innovation in gameplay or technology". The award was initially known as Innovation at the 3rd British Academy Games Awards ceremony, held in 2006, and was awarded to Dr. Kawashima's Brain Training: How Old is Your Brain?, developed and published by Nintendo. The award was absent from ceremonies held in 2008 to 2010. before returning to the 8th ceremony held in 2011, under the name Game Innovation. For the 2020 awards, the category was renamed again for Technical Achievement as to encompass gameplay programming and visual engineering.

Since its inception, the award has been given to thirteen games. As a developer, Nintendo Entertainment Analysis & Development has a leading six nominations in the category, including two wins, while Japan Studio holds the record for most nominations without a win, with four. Among publishers, Nintendo and Sony Interactive Entertainment are tied with two awards each. Xbox Game Studios are the publisher with the most nominations without a win, with five. 

The current holder of the award is Ratchet & Clank: Rift Apart by Insomniac Games and Sony Interactive Entertainment, which won at the 18th British Academy Games Awards in 2022.

Winners and nominees 
In the following table, the years are listed as per BAFTA convention, and generally correspond to the year of game release in the United Kingdom.

Multiple nominations and wins

Developers

Publishers

References 

Technical Achievement
Awards for video game technology